Darb Kazem (also Romanized as Darb Kāẓem; also known as Darb) is a village in Susan-e Sharqi Rural District, Susan District, Izeh County, Khuzestan Province, Iran. At the 2006 census, its population was 236, in 42 families.

References 

Populated places in Izeh County